Robin's Road Trip is a 2016 Dutch documentary film directed by Simone de Vries. It was nominated to 45th International Emmy Awards in the best arts programming category.

References

External links 
 Robin de Puy: Ik ben het allemaal zelf (2016) - IMDb
 Official website

2016 television films
2016 films
2016 documentary films
Dutch documentary films
2010s Dutch-language films